Gevgelija (Macedonian: Општина Гевгелија, Opština Gevgelija) is a municipality in the southern part of North Macedonia. Gevgelija is also the name of the town where the municipal seat is found. Gevgelija Municipality is part of the Southeastern Statistical Region.

Geography
The municipality borders Kavadarci Municipality to the west, Demir Kapija Municipality to the northwest, Valandovo Municipality to the northeast, Bogdanci Municipality to the east, and Greece to the south. There is a spring named  24 km from Gevgelija which is "famous for its mineral water and its healing properties for stomach and kidney diseases". Mount Kozuf overshadows the municipality in the evening, and is now the site of a ski resort.

Industry
The Allchar deposit is located on the slopes of Mount Kozuf. In 2017, 13,100 residents out of 13,300 eligible voters in the municipality decided in a referendum against the permission of a gold mine operator that had hoped to exploit an area north-west of the city Gevgelija, along the Konjska river.

Demographics

According to the last national census from 2021, Gevgelija Municipality has 21,582 inhabitants.

Ethnic groups in the municipality include:

Inhabited places

There is a total of 17 inhabited places in the Gevgelija municipality. There is one town and 16 villages.

References

External links
 Official website

 
Southeastern Statistical Region
Municipalities of North Macedonia